Peter Odhiambo (born 25 November 1950) is a Ugandan boxer. He competed in the men's lightweight event at the 1972 Summer Olympics.

References

1950 births
Living people
Ugandan male boxers
Olympic boxers of Uganda
Boxers at the 1972 Summer Olympics
Place of birth missing (living people)
Lightweight boxers